Taiwan–Vietnam relations are conducted on an unofficial level, as Hanoi adheres to a one-China policy and officially recognises the People's Republic of China only. However, this has not stopped bilateral visits and significant flows of migrants and investment capital between Taiwan and Vietnam. Taiwan has been the fourth largest source of foreign direct investment in Vietnam since 2006. Both countries maintain representative offices; Taiwan is represented by the Taipei Economic and Cultural Office in Hanoi and Ho Chi Minh City, while Vietnam is represented by the Vietnam Economic and Cultural Office in Taipei, both acting as de facto embassies. Vietnam is, to date, the only communist state to have relations with Taiwan.

History

Dutch Formosa
Vietnamese slaves were taken by the Dutch East India Company to Taiwan when it was under Dutch rule, and the Dutch on Taiwan conducted trade with Vietnam. The Dutch had Pampang and Quinamese slaves on their colony in Taiwan, and in 1643 offered rewards to aboriginal allies who would recapture the slaves for them when they ran away. Eighteen Quinamese and Javanese slaves were involved in a Dutch attack against the Tammalaccouw aboriginals, along with 110 Chinese and 225 troops under Governor Traudenius on 11 January 1642. Seven Quinnamese and three Javanese were involved in a gold hunting expedition along with 200 Chinese and 218 troops under Serior Merchant Cornelis Caesar from November 1645 to January 1646. ("Quinam" was the Dutch name for the Vietnamese Nguyen lord-ruled Cochinchina.) The Dutch sided with the Trịnh lords of Tonkin (Northern Vietnam) against the Nguyen lords of Quinam during the Trịnh–Nguyễn War and were therefore hostile to Quinam.

Relationship with South Vietnam

Following World War II, under a United Nations Mandate,  200,000 Chinese troops under General Lu Han were sent by Chiang Kai-shek to Indochina north of the 16th parallel, with the aim of accepting the surrender of Japanese occupying forces. These troops remained in Indochina until 1946. The Chinese used the VNQDD, the Vietnamese version of the Chinese Kuomintang, to increase their influence in Indochina and put pressure on their opponents. Chiang Kai-shek threatened the French with war to force them to negotiate with the Vietminh leader Ho Chi Minh. In February 1946, Chiang Kai-shek forced the French colonists to surrender all of their concessions in China and renounce their extraterritorial privileges, in exchange for withdrawing from northern Indochina and allowing French troops to reoccupy the region.

South Vietnam, while it existed, had official diplomatic relations with the Republic of China (which the regime was driven in 1949 to Taiwan, the island formerly under Japanese rule from 1895 to 1945) due to the two countries' common anti-communist policies. Ngo Dinh Diem's government established formal relations with the ROC in 1955. The relationship between the two governments was quite close, far better than the Chinese Republic's relations with other decolonized countries in southeast Asia; Taipei received more presidential visits from South Vietnam than it did from any other country in the region.

Students from South Vietnam studied in Formosa, and Taipei provided material and logistical support to Saigon during the Vietnam War. The Chinese Republic sought to provide southeast Asian countries with its own hard-earned and bitter expertise in anti-communist affairs, and South Vietnam was a major recipient of these lessons. Taipei's ambassador to Saigon from 1964 until 1972 was Hu Lien, a Chinese Army general with significant military experience during the Chinese Civil War. Taipei and Saigon were even sister cities. However relations were occasionally strained, especially over the issue of overseas Chinese in the country, many of whom held Chinese nationality, estimated by Taipei at 1.2 million. Taipei was offended by Saigon's low estimates of their population, among other things.

Just before the fall of Saigon, South Vietnamese president Nguyen Van Thieu fled to Taipei, where his brother, Nguyen Van Kieu, was serving as ambassador. An aircraft of Air Vietnam, the South Vietnamese airline, was abandoned at Taipei Songshan Airport, and eventually became the property of a ROC-based airline.

Collapse and reopening of relations
After the collapse of its South Vietnamese ally, Taipei initially maintained a policy of zero contact with Vietnam, not even private trade and postal contact; furthermore followed by the 1987 Lieyu massacre with innocent Vietnamese refugees suffered. Furthermore, it was revealed that those Vietnamese boat people were overseas Chinese families. This left it ill-placed to take advantage of the rapid deterioration in relations between Hanoi and Beijing, even during the Sino-Vietnamese War and its aftermath. For its part, Vietnam, like other socialist states, expressed displeasure with Beijing in foreign relations by siding more closely with its rival in the Communist bloc, Moscow; for a socialist country to have contact with capitalist Taipei was unthinkable. However, in the late 1980s, as the Cold War thawed, contact between Hanoi and Taipei slowly resumed; indeed, observers saw this as one of the key events indicating the end of the Cold War in the region.

Bilateral visits

In 2006, Taiwan Semiconductor Manufacturing Company chairman Morris Chang flew to Hanoi as a special representative of then-President Chen Shui-bian to the Asia-Pacific Economic Cooperation forum. Unusually, Chang flew to Hanoi in Chen's presidential aircraft, a Boeing 737-800 operated by the Republic of China Air Force. The aircraft, which displays the flag of the Republic of China and its national emblem, had never before been permitted to land on the soil of a country with which Taiwan lacked formal relations.

Investment
Foreign direct investment is an important policy tool of Taiwan; as Samuel Ku argues, Taipei uses "the island's economic resources in exchange for political gains from Vietnam". In the early days of doi moi, Vietnam was very interested in learning from Taiwan's experiences with small and medium enterprises in order to alleviate Vietnam's own chronic shortages of consumer goods. By 2006, Taiwan-based investors had poured US$8 billion into Vietnam, especially in equipment and buildings for conducting labour-intensive manufacturing in export processing zones. This scale of investment made Taiwan Vietnam's largest foreign investor.

Movement of people

There are tens of thousands of Taiwanese expatriates in Vietnam and Vietnamese people in Taiwan.

References

Bibliography

Vietnam
Bilateral relations of Vietnam